The 1995 Trophée de France was the third event of five in the 1995–96 ISU Champions Series, a senior-level international invitational competition series. It was held in Bordeaux on November 14–17. Medals were awarded in the disciplines of men's singles, ladies' singles, pair skating, and ice dancing. Skaters earned points toward qualifying for the 1995–96 Champions Series Final.

Results

Men

Ladies

Pairs

Ice dancing

External links
 1995 Champions Series results

1995 in figure skating
Internationaux de France
Trophée Éric Bompard
Figure
International figure skating competitions hosted by France